Mark Campbell (born March 25, 1980) is an American basketball coach who is currently the head women's basketball coach at Sacramento State University.

Playing career 
Campbell initially played at Cal Poly before transferring to Clackamas Community College. At Clackamas, he led the nation in assists at 10.2 per game before transferring out to Hawaii to finish his career.

Coaching career 
Campbell started his coaching career at Clackamas Community College as a volunteer assistant before going on to coach at Pepperdine as an assistant. He went on to coach at Saint Mary's for two seasons before turning to coaching women's basketball.

Campbell was named an assistant coach at Oregon State in 2011, where he began to establish himself as one of the nation's top recruiters, earning a promotion to associate head coach during his tenure.

Oregon 
Campbell was hired as an assistant at Oregon in 2014, and was promoted to associate head coach in 2015. At Oregon, he played a critical role in the Ducks landing top recruits such as Sabrina Ionescu, Satou Sabally and Ruthy Hebard as well as helping the Ducks land the number-one recruiting class in the country in 2020.

Sacramento State 
Campbell was named the head coach at Sacramento State in 2021.

Head coaching record

Personal life 
Campbell is married to the former Ashley Smith, a former basketball player at Vanderbilt. The couple have two daughters, Maley and Makay.

References

External links 
 
 Sacramento State profile
 Oregon profile

1980 births
Living people
Sportspeople from Bellingham, Washington
People from Mount Vernon, Washington
Basketball players from Washington (state)
Basketball coaches from Washington (state)
Point guards
Cal Poly Mustangs men's basketball players
Clackamas Cougars men's basketball players
Hawaii Rainbow Warriors basketball players
Clackamas Cougars men's basketball coaches
Pepperdine Waves men's basketball coaches
Saint Mary's Gaels men's basketball coaches
Oregon State Beavers women's basketball coaches
Oregon Ducks women's basketball coaches
Sacramento State Hornets women's basketball coaches